What's Your Number? is a 2011 American romantic comedy film directed by Mark Mylod and starring Anna Faris and Chris Evans. Written by Gabrielle Allan and Jennifer Crittenden, it is based on Karyn Bosnak's book 20 Times a Lady.

Plot
In Boston, Ally Darling is a thirty-something woman, struggling to make better life decisions. Her boyfriend Rick breaks up with her when she asks him to attend her sister Daisy's wedding, and she then gets laid off. On the subway home, Ally comes across a Marie Claire magazine article entitled "What's Your Number?", which says that women who have more than twenty lovers in their lifetime have difficulty finding a husband.

After making a list of all the men she slept with, she realizes she's at 19, making her decide not to have sex with anyone else until she finds "the one". This lasts all of a few hours when she wakes up after Daisy's bachelorette party and discovers that she hooked up with her ex-boss Roger while drunk.

Hoping to avoid an awkward confrontation, Ally lets her musician neighbor Colin Shea into her apartment so that Roger will leave. It turns out that Colin was only over to avoid a girl he just slept with, because he doesn't want to give the women he sees any expectations.

Ally then runs into "Disgusting Donald", her once overweight ex-boyfriend, now successful and attractive with his fiancée. She decides to track down all her exes hoping that one will have grown into the man she wants to marry, and therefore the number of men she has slept with won't ever increase. She gets help from Colin, who is skilled in "digging up dirt", to find all her exes in exchange for letting him stay in her place after his one-night stands, telling Colin to pay particular attention to one ex Jake Adams, who Ally sees as "the one that got away".

Things do not quite work as Ally hoped and, one-by-one, she remembers why it didn't work out with each. It ranged from one being in the same job since their break-up to another requiring her to pretend to be British. Depressed after the failed meetings, Ally has a night out with Colin culminating in their growing closer and almost having sex. She stops him, but decides to take him as her date to Daisy's wedding. Daisy and Ally's friends worry she is falling for him, warning and reminding her of his promiscuous nature. She is later infuriated to find out Colin had found Jake Adams' contact details but withheld them, believing they were going to become an item, and they have a falling-out.

Ally successfully contacts Jake, and they begin to date again. She takes him to her sister's wedding while Colin and his band perform at a different one. Dancing with her dad at the reception, he makes her realize that her happiness lies in being herself. (Not pleasing her mom, who wants her to marry Jake Adams.) Dancing with Jake, Ally confesses her "number" ("body count") to Jake, and he, thinking she is joking, expresses disgust at the thought. Ally quickly realizes her true feelings lie with Colin and she and Jake are incompatible, so she breaks it off with him. In doing so, she casts aside her fears (in principle) over her number. Ally then goes around the city to numerous weddings to find Colin and confesses her feelings.

Waking up with Colin the next morning, Ally gets a call from an old fling telling her that they in fact did not sleep together. Ally rejoices in the fact that Colin is indeed the 20th and last (ongoing) man, with whom she will ever be.

Cast

 Anna Faris as Ally Darling
Nadine Jacobson as Ally (age 14)
 Chris Evans as Colin Shea
 Ari Graynor as Daisy Anne Darling
 Blythe Danner as Ava Darling
 Ed Begley, Jr. as Mr. Darling
 Oliver Jackson-Cohen as Eddie Vogel
 Dave Annable as Jake Adams
Colby Parsons as Jake (age 14)
 Heather Burns as Eileen
 Eliza Coupe as Sheila
 Kate Simses as Katie
 Tika Sumpter as Jamie
 Joel McHale as Roger the Boss
 Chris Pratt as Disgusting Donald
 Denise Vasi as Cara
 Zachary Quinto as Rick
 Mike Vogel as Dave Hansen
 Martin Freeman as Simon
 Andy Samberg as Jerry Perry
 Thomas Lennon as Dr. Barrett Ingold
 Anthony Mackie as Tom Piper
 Ivana Miličević as Jacinda
 Aziz Ansari as Jay

Release, reception

Box office
What's Your Number? grossed $14 million in the U.S. and Canada and $16.4 million in other territories, for a total gross of $30.4 million against a budget of $20 million. It grossed $5.4 million in its opening weekend, finishing 8th at the box office.

Critical reception
What's Your Number? received negative reviews from critics. On Rotten Tomatoes it has a rating of 24%, based on 113 reviews, with an average rating of 4.24/10. The website's critical consensus reads, "The comic timing of Anna Faris is sharp as always, but it's wasted away in this predictable, boilerplate comedy." Metacritic gives it a score of 35 out of 100, based on 31 critics, indicating "generally unfavorable reviews".

References

External links
 
 
 
 

2011 romantic comedy films
2010s sex comedy films
2011 films
20th Century Fox films
American romantic comedy films
American sex comedy films
2010s English-language films
Films based on American novels
Films directed by Mark Mylod
Films produced by Beau Flynn
Films scored by Aaron Zigman
Films set in Boston
Films shot in Boston
Regency Enterprises films
2010s American films